Jatugriha is a 1964 Bengali social drama film directed by Tapan Sinha and produced by Uttam Kumar based on the novel of the same name by Subodh Ghosh. The film was produced and released on 20 March 1964 under the banner of Uttam Kumar Films Private Limited. The music of the film composed by the legendary Ashish Khan. This was the fifth film produced by Uttam Kumar. A 1987 Bollywood film Ijaazat, directed by Gulzar, follows a similar plot. The film stars Uttam Kumar, Arundhati Devi, Anil Chatterjee and Bikash Roy.

Plot
Shatadal meets Madhuri after a long time in a railway station and their story is narrated through a series of flashbacks. They actually were a happily married couple. Satadal was a successful engineer who lived with his wife Madhuri. But day-by-day, their relationship runs into emotional stress due to childlessness. Madhuri cannot bear a child and her husband Shatadal is fond of children. Finally, the couple decided to break up. When they meet in the station, they realize their fondness for each other has not died.

Cast
 Uttam Kumar as Shatadal
 Arundhati Devi as Madhuri
 Anil Chatterjee as Supryio
 Bikash Roy
 Kajal Gupta
 Binota Roy

Soundtrack
Only song in the film scoreded by Asish Khan and composed by Rabindranath Tagore

Production
The story of the film was written by the famous author Subodh Ghosh. Uttam Kumar was impressed by the story and wanted to produce it as a movie and requested Tapan Sinha to direct the project. This was the fifth film produced by Uttam and the third film under his own banner  Uttam Kumar Films Private Limited. Uttam wanted to do something unique and Jatugriha perfectly served his purpose. Their pair became a brand in Bengal. They delivered 27 films and almost all the films became box-office success. Uttam Kumar waned a versatile actress to play the main female character of the story and hence Arundhati Devi was cast. Arundhati Devi acted with Uttam Kumar in earlier films like Bicharak 1959, and Jhinder Bandi 1961.

Release
The film was released in India on 20 March 1964 - the same year when Satyajit Ray's Charulata was released. Jatugriha literally with English translates and subtitle as The Burnt Home. The film was distributed by Chayabani Private Limited.

Reception
The film did not perform well at the box office.

Award
1964: National Film Award - Certificate of Merit third best feature film in Bengali - Uttam Kumar

References

External links
 

1964 films
Bengali-language Indian films
Indian drama films
Indian black-and-white films
1960s Bengali-language films
Films based on short fiction
Films directed by Tapan Sinha
Bengali films remade in other languages